The Dickinson Museum Center is an organization that preserves and presents history through a museum complex in Dickinson, North Dakota. The organization operates the museum center, which serves as a history museum for the city of Dickinson, Stark County, and Southwest North Dakota.

The museum consists of a city-owned,  park that includes multiple buildings and is managed in part by several non-profit organizations.

Badlands Dinosaur Museum
This museum houses thousands of rock, mineral, and fossil specimens including a complete Triceratops skeleton, and award-winning feathered dinosaur models by artist Boban Filipovic. It was privately run from 1993 to 2015 during which time it was called "Dakota Dinosaur Museum". Since December 2015 it has been owned and operated by the City of Dickinson, and was renamed "Badlands Dinosaur Museum" in 2017.

Joachim Regional Museum
The Joachim Regional Museum features local art and history exhibits, and is managed by the Southwestern North Dakota Museum Foundation.  Permanent exhibits include a Western art gallery and a dollhouse.  The building includes the Osborn Reading and Research Room.

Prairie Outpost Park
Five historic and five reproduction buildings are located in the park east of the museum. Several other groups manage buildings and/or host events in the park throughout the year including Czech, Scandinavian, and Germans from Russia heritage organizations.

The historic buildings include a house, train depot, general store, church, and school. The reproduced buildings include a print shop, an ethnic German-Russian stone house, a Czech town hall, a Scandinavian Stabbur, and a blacksmith shop.  Other structures in the park include the Heritage Pavilion picnic shelter, a veteran's chapel, an oil pumpjack, a coal car, a Northern Pacific train caboose, a windmill, and restrooms.

Pioneer Machinery Hall
This museum focuses on the early agricultural and ranching history of Stark County, and includes threshing machines, tractors and other horse-drawn and mechanized farm equipment.  The museum is operated by the Stark County Historical Society, and is located in Prairie Outpost Park.

Other sites

Dickinson Convention and Visitors Bureau
The visitor's bureau provides information about local and regional attractions and events.  The CVB is a separately managed organization from the Dickinson Museum Center.

Historic Preservation Commission
The director of the Dickinson Museum Center also serves as Historic Preservationist for the city of Dickinson. The Historic Preservationist serves as staff liaison to the Historic Preservation Commission for the city.

References

External links 
Dickinson Museum Center
City of Dickinson
Dickinson Convention and Visitor's Bureau

Agriculture museums in the United States
Open-air museums in North Dakota
History museums in North Dakota
Art museums and galleries in North Dakota
Museums in Stark County, North Dakota
Dickinson, North Dakota